Stefan II may refer to:

 Stefan Nemanjić (1165–1228)
 Ştefan II of Moldavia (died 1447)